Nathaniel Farnsworth was a member of the Maine House of Representatives and the Wisconsin State Assembly. He was a member of the House of Representatives in 1848. Later, Farnsworth was a Republican member of the Assembly during the 1875 session. In addition, he was a candidate for the Wisconsin State Senate in 1863 and a member of the county board of Sheboygan County, Wisconsin. Farnsworth was born on January 20, 1820, in what is now known as Jonesboro, Maine.

References

People from Washington County, Maine
People from Sheboygan County, Wisconsin
County supervisors in Wisconsin
Members of the Maine House of Representatives
Republican Party members of the Wisconsin State Assembly
1820 births
Year of death missing